Trent Tomlinson (born July 3, 1975) is an American country music artist. After several failed attempts at finding a record deal, Tomlinson was signed to Lyric Street Records in 2005, with his debut album Country Is My Rock, released in early 2006. This album produced three Top 40 singles on the U.S. Billboard Hot Country Songs charts: "Drunker Than Me" at No. 19, "One Wing in the Fire" at No. 11, and "Just Might Have Her Radio On" at No. 21. Three further singles were released in 2009.

Biography
Tomlinson was born in Blytheville, Arkansas. He was raised in Kennett, Missouri. His father is a former basketball star who set scoring records at the University of Missouri and was drafted by the Cleveland Cavaliers. He was also the basketball coach, biology teacher, and assistant principal at Kennett High School.

In his junior year of high school, Tomlinson reached the finals for "You Can Be a Star," a television talent show on The Nashville Network (now Spike TV), in which Trent placed second. After numerous deals cut short due to labels that went bankrupt or were being taken over, Tomlinson landed a songwriting deal with Cal IV Entertainment. Some of his songs were recorded by Emerson Drive and Blue County on their respective debut albums. He also cut some sides for Lyric Street Records, with whom he later signed a record deal. Tomlinson's debut single, "Drunker Than Me," was released in late 2005, followed by his album Country Is My Rock. Two additional singles were also released from the album: "One Wing in the Fire" and "Just Might Have Her Radio On," the former is a song about Tomlinson's father. Tomlinson also co-wrote the track "Missing Missouri" on Sara Evans's 2005 album Real Fine Place and "Why Can't I Leave Her Alone" on George Strait's 2006 album It Just Comes Natural.

On December 15, 2008, it was announced that Tomlinson would be the second artist signed to Lyric Street's subsidiary label, Carolwood Records. His fourth single, "That's How It Still Oughta Be," made its chart debut in January 2009. That song fell from the charts in May 2009 and was replaced by "Henry Cartwright's Produce Stand." A third single, "Angels Like Her" (a re-recording of a song on his debut), was released on October 26, 2009, shortly before the closure of Carolwood. Tomlinson subsequently returned to Lyric Street before parting ways in March 2010. All three songs were included on an EP titled A Guy Like Me.

Tomlinson released "Man Without a Woman" via Skyville Records in 2011, and did not release an album despite the single charting. In 2014, Parmalee released the single "Close Your Eyes," which Tomlinson co-wrote.

Personal life
Tomlinson married model Jessica Lowman on March 22, 2008. They have one daughter, Harleigh Alexyia Tomlinson, who was born January 14, 2008. Tomlinson and Lowman are now divorced.

Discography

Studio albums

Extended plays

Singles

Notes

Music videos

References

External links
 Official website

1975 births
American country singer-songwriters
American male singer-songwriters
Country musicians from Arkansas
Living people
Lyric Street Records artists
Singer-songwriters from Arkansas
21st-century American singers
21st-century American male singers